The 10th Sydney International Piano Competition took place at Sydney's Seymour Centre and Opera House from 4 to 21 July 2012 and it was contested by 36 pianists from 14 countries. Avan Yu won the competition, while Nikolay Khozyainov and Dmitry Onishchenko were awarded the 2nd and 3rd prizes.

Jury

  Warren Thomson (chairman)
  Michael Brimer
  Manana Doidjashvili
  Aquiles Delle Vigne
  Norma Fisher
  Choong-Mo Kang 
  Heinz Medjimorec
  Ian Munro
  Phillip Shovk
  Arie Vardi

Prizes

Works commissioned for the competition
 Anne Boyd - Kabarli Meditation (Dawn)
 Carl Vine - Toccatissimo

Competition results (by rounds)

First and Second Round
5–8 July 2012

  Arta Arnicāne
  Mikhail Berestnev
  Feng Bian
  Giulio Biddau
  Stefan Cassomenos
  Wei Cao
  Angelika Fuchs
  Tanya Gabrielian
  James Guan
  Stefano Guarascio
  Atsushi Imada
  Maya Irgalina
  Elizaveta Ivanova
  Wenbin Jin
  Joanne Kang
  Nikolay Khozyainov
  Jin-Hong Li
  Brian Yuebing Lin
  Ke Lin
  Aaron Liu
  Ilaria Locatelli
  Konrad Olszewski
  Dmitry Onishchenko
  Olga Paliy
  Marios Panteliadis
  Poom Prommachart
  Alex Raineri
  Lu Shen
  Yifan Sun
  Benoît Tourette
  Sean Yeh
  Jung-Yeon Yim
  Qian Yong
  Tomoaki Yoshida
  Avan Yu
  Hao Zhu

Quarterfinals
9-10 July 2012

  Arta Arnicāne
  Mikhail Berestnev
  Giulio Biddau
  Wei Cao
  Tanya Gabrielian
  James Guan
  Stefano Guarascio
  Atsushi Imada
  Maya Irgalina
  Elizaveta Ivanova
  Nikolay Khozyainov
  Jin-Hong Li
  Dmitry Onishchenko
  Olga Paliy
  Lu Shen
  Sean Yeh
  Qian Yong
  Tomoaki Yoshida
  Avan Yu
  Hao Zhu

Semifinals
11-13 July 2012

  Arta Arnicāne
  Mikhail Berestnev
  Giulio Biddau
  Tanya Gabrielian
  Stefano Guarascio
  Nikolay Khozyainov
  Jin-Hong Li
  Dmitry Onishchenko
  Lu Shen
  Tomoaki Yoshida
  Avan Yu
  Hao Zhu

Final
17-21 July 2012

 Concerti
  Mikhail Berestnev — Mozart: 21st, Rachmaninoff: Rhapsody on a Theme of Paganini
  Tanya Gabrielian — Mozart: 21st, Tchaikovsky: 1st
  Nikolay Khozyainov — Mozart: 21st, Rachmaninoff: 3rd
  Dmitry Onishchenko — Mozart: 17th, Rachmaninoff: 3rd
  Avan Yu — Mozart: 17th, Rachmaninoff: Rhapsody on a Theme of Paganini
  Hao Zhu — Mozart: 24th, Rachmaninoff: 2nd

References

 
July 2012 events in Australia
2012 in Australian music
2010s in Sydney